Susloparov is a Russian surname. In the early- and mid-20th century, it would be often transliterated as Sousloparov, due to the French-style transliteration convention used in Soviet passports.

Notable persons with surname Susloparov:
 Ivan Alekseyevich Susloparov (1897–1974), Red Army general
 Yuri Vladimirovich Susloparov (born 1958), Soviet soccer player